Dave Simmons is a former linebacker in the National Football League and the United States Football League. He was drafted by the Green Bay Packers in the sixth round of the 1979 NFL Draft and played that season with the team. The following season, he was a member of the Detroit Lions. After a season away from the NFL, he played with the Baltimore Colts during the 1982 NFL season and the Chicago Bears during the 1983 NFL season.  In the fall of 1984, Simmons signed with the defending USFL Champion Baltimore Stars but was traded to the Houston Gamblers for a draft choice during training camp in February of 1985.  Simmons made the opening day roster of the Gamblers, however, was deactivated for the first game at Los Angeles and two days later was waived.  Three weeks later, Simmons signed with the Arizona Outlaws and played as a reserve linebacker for the remaining 15 games (starting 3).

References

People from Goldsboro, North Carolina
Green Bay Packers players
Detroit Lions players
Baltimore Colts players
Chicago Bears players
Arizona Outlaws players
American football linebackers
North Carolina Tar Heels football players
1957 births
Living people